Los Rancheros Visitadores or the "Visiting Ranchers" is a social club in the United States. The group meets on ranch land in Santa Barbara and embarks northward on a  journey across the countryside after receiving a blessing at the Santa Ynez Mission. It attracts over 700 riders on its annual trek.

It was founded by the banker and United Airlines co-founder Jack Mitchell and friends, and Mitchell was the first president and led the group for 25 years. Members and guests have included Edward Borein, Thomas M. Storke, Clark Gable, Ronald Reagan, and Walt Disney.

In 1938, Los Rancheros acquired the Covarrubias Adobe from historian and author John Southworth for $15,000, and they undertook reconstruction and strengthening of the house in 1940.

See also
 Bohemian Club
 Bohemian Grove
 Cremation of Care

References

External links
 A photo of a Trail of RVs
 Desert Caballeros Western Museum 
 Verde Vaqueros

Equestrian organizations
Clubs and societies in the United States
1930 establishments in the United States
Organizations established in 1930